Raquel Jaramillo Palacio (born July 13, 1963) is an American author and graphic designer. She is the author of several novels for children, including the best-selling Wonder, which was adapted into a 2017 film starring Julia Roberts and Owen Wilson.

Career
R.J began her career as an illustrator, designing book covers for Paul Auster, Thomas Pynchon and others. During the course of her career she designed many hundreds of book covers, covering both fiction and non-fiction books. She also illustrated several children's books that she wrote herself. For the first two decades of her career, she wrote books at night after her day job as a designer. She illustrated her early books which were board books for children, published under the name Raquel Jaramillo.

In 2021, Random House announced that her new novel Pony would have a first printing of 500,000 copies. It is her first novel not featuring characters from the Wonder universe.

Personal life
Born in New York City as the daughter of Colombian immigrants, Palacio attended Manhattan's High School of Art & Design and majored in illustration at the Parsons School of Design. She spent a year at the American University of Paris, travelling widely throughout Europe, before returning to New York. She currently lives in New York City together with her husband Russell Gordon, an executive art director at Simon and Schuster Children's Books, and their two sons Caleb and Joseph.

Awards and honors
She was a recipient of the Christopher Award for Wonder in 2013, and the Dorothy Canfield Fisher Children's Book Award in 2014. Wonder was on The New York Times Best Seller list and was also on the Texas Bluebonnet Award master list. Wonder was the winner of the 2014 Maine Student Book Award, Vermont's Dorothy Canfield Fisher Children's Book Award, the 2015 Mark Twain Award, Hawaii's 2015 Nene Award, the 2015 Young Hoosier Book Award, and the Junior Young Reader's Choice Award for 2015. In Illinois, it won both the Bluestem and Caudill Awards in 2014.

Bibliography
 Ride, Baby, Ride (1998)
 Dream, Baby, Dream! (1998)
 Last Summer: A Little Book for Dads (2004)
 Wonder (2012)
 The Extraordinary (2012)
 Auggie & Me: Three Wonder Stories (2014)
 365 Days of Wonder: Mr. Browne's Book of Precepts (2014)
 We're All Wonders (2017)
 White Bird (2019)
 Pony (2021)

References

External links 

 

American women novelists
1963 births
Living people
American writers of young adult literature
American people of Colombian descent
Pseudonymous women writers
Women writers of young adult literature
21st-century American novelists
21st-century American women writers
21st-century pseudonymous writers
Hispanic and Latino American writers
Hispanic and Latino American people
American women graphic designers
Colombian American